William Newell Small (February 22, 1927 – December 9, 2016) was a four star admiral in the United States Navy who served as Vice Chief of Naval Operations and Commander in Chief, NATO Allied Forces Southern Europe and United States Naval Forces Europe.

Early life and education
Born in Little Rock, Arkansas, on February 22, 1927, Small graduated from Malvern High School at the age of 15, attending Admiral Farragut Military Academy in Pine Beach, New Jersey until he was old enough to receive his appointment to the United States Naval Academy, class of 1948.

Naval career
As a Flag Officer, he served as Commander Carrier Division 3, Pacific from 1975 to 1976; and Commander United States Sixth Fleet.

Small was Vice Chief of Naval Operations from 1981 to 1983 and Commander in Chief, United States Naval Forces Europe/Commander in Chief, Allied Forces Southern Europe from 1983 to 1985.

The Arkansas Aviation Historical Society inducted Small into the Arkansas Aviation Hall of Fame in 1992. He died on December 9, 2016, at the age of 89.

Decorations and medals

References

1927 births
2016 deaths
Admiral Farragut Academy alumni
Malvern High School (Arkansas) alumni
Military personnel from Little Rock, Arkansas
Recipients of the Legion of Merit
United States Naval Academy alumni
United States Navy admirals
Vice Chiefs of Naval Operations